The following highways are numbered 641:

Canada

United States